Joseph Edward Bussard Jr. (July 11, 1936 – September 26, 2022) was an American collector of 78-rpm records. He was noted for owning more than 15,000 records, principally from the 1920s and 1930s, at the time of his death.

Early life
Bussard was born in Frederick, Maryland, on July 11, 1936. His father managed the family's farm supply business, and his mother, Viola (Culler), was a housewife. Bussard began collecting when he was seven or eight, starting with Gene Autry records. During his teenage years, he and his cousin collected everything from rare coins to beehives to birds' nests. He attended Frederick High School, but left in eleventh grade without graduating. He initially worked at his family's business and in a supermarket, but was unemployed from the late 1950s onwards.

Career
Over his lifetime, Bussard amassed a collection of between 15,000 and 25,000 records, primarily of American folk, gospel, jazz and blues from the 1920s and 1930s. From 1956 until 1970, Bussard ran the last 78 rpm record label, Fonotone, which was dedicated to the release of new recordings of old-time music. Among these were recordings by hundreds of performers, including the first recordings by the guitarist John Fahey. A five-CD anthology of Fonotone releases was issued in 2005 by Dust-to-Digital. It was nominated for the Grammy Award for Best Boxed or Special Limited Edition Package in 2006.

Bussard was the subject of a documentary film, Desperate Man Blues (2003), and his collection was mined for a compilation CD, Down in the Basement. He also authored his own entry in The Encyclopedia of Collectibles, which was published in 1978. He shared his collection, which included many only-known-copies of records, best-known-copies, and numerous reissue labels, as well as work with individuals for whom he taped recordings from his collection for a nominal sum for decades. His daughter reckoned that a minimum of 150 individuals visited their home annually to hear him play songs and recount how he obtained his records.

Bussard produced a weekly music program, Country Classics, for Georgia Tech's radio station, WREK Atlanta. He had radio programs on other stations: including WPAQ-AM 740 in Mount Airy, North Carolina, and WDVX in Knoxville, Tennessee. He disliked the city of Nashville, Tennessee, sometimes called "Music City", calling it "Trashville". His dislike for modern music, especially hip hop and rock and roll, was well documented.  

In a 2022 interview, Bussard cited the recording, "Dark Was the Night, Cold Was the Ground" by Blind Willie Johnson, as one of the greatest recordings of all time. He visited a flea market in Emmitsburg, Maryland a month before his death to look for more 78s, but left empty-handed.

Personal life
Bussard married Esther Mae Keith in 1965. She worked as a hairdresser and cosmetologist to support the family. They remained married for 34 years until her death in 1999. Together, they had a daughter.

Bussard died on September 26, 2022, at his home in Frederick while in hospice care. He was 86, and was diagnosed with pancreatic cancer two years prior to his death.

Notes

References

External links
 
 

1936 births
2022 deaths
American folk-song collectors 
Deaths from cancer in Maryland
Deaths from pancreatic cancer
People from Frederick, Maryland
Record collectors